Pleurotoma mediocris is a species of sea snail, a marine gastropod mollusk in the family Turridae.

According to the World Register of Marine Species, this is a nomen dubium.

Distribution
This marine species occurs off Réunion and New Caledonia.

References

External links
 Kilburn R.N., Fedosov A. & Kantor Yu.I. (2014) The shallow-water New Caledonia Drilliidae of genus Clavus Montfort, 1810 (Mollusca: Gastropoda: Conoidea). Zootaxa 3818(1): 1–69

Turridae
Gastropods described in 1863